The 1973 Nobel Prize in Literature was awarded to the Australian writer Patrick White (1912–1990) "for an epic and psychological narrative art which has introduced a new continent into literature." He is the first and the only Australian recipient of the prize.

Laureate

The historical themes of Patrick White's novels and plays focus on his own Australia and its people. During his lifetime, he enjoyed greater acclaim abroad than he did at home, where his critical gaze was occasionally misunderstood. In 1939, he released Happy Valley, his debut novel. The Tree of Man (1955), a book about a farmer and his wife struggling to build a future in rural Australia, was his major literary success. Modern humanity's sense of loneliness and emptiness is a recurrent topic in his literary works. His other well-known works include The Vivisector (1970) and The Eye of the Storm (1973).

References

External links
Award Ceremony speech by Artur Lundkvist nobelprize.org
Press release nobelprize.org

1973